Moscow Time (MSK) is the time zone for the city of Moscow, Russia, and most of western Russia, including Saint Petersburg. It is the second-westernmost of the eleven time zones of Russia. It has been set to UTC+03:00 without DST since 26 October 2014; before that date it had been set to UTC+04:00 year-round on 27 March 2011.

Moscow Time is used to schedule trains, ships, etc. throughout Russia, but airplane travel is scheduled using local time. Times in Russia are often announced throughout the country on radio stations as Moscow Time, which is also registered in telegrams, etc.  Descriptions of time zones in Russia are often based on Moscow Time rather than UTC. For example, Yakutsk (UTC+09:00) is said to be MSK+6 in Russia.

History 
Until the October Revolution, the official time in Moscow corresponded to GMT+02:30:17 (according to the longitude of the Astronomical Observatory of Moscow State University). In 1919 the Council of People's Commissars of the RSFSR introduced the system of time zones in the country, while Moscow was assigned to the second administrative time zone, the time of which should correspond to GMT+02:00. Other zones east of the 37.5° meridian to Arkhangelsk, Vologda, Yaroslavl, Kostroma, Ivanovo, Vladimir, Ryazan, Tula, Lipetsk, Voronezh and Rostov-on-Don were also included in the second belt.

In accordance with the 16 June 1930 Decree of the Council of People's Commissars, the Decree Time was introduced by adding one hour to the time in each time zone of the USSR, so that Moscow Time became three hours ahead of Universal Time.

Until 2011, during the winter, between the last Sunday of October and the last Sunday of March, Moscow Standard Time (MSK, МСК) was three hours ahead of UTC, or UTC+03:00; during the summer, Moscow Time shifted forward an additional hour ahead of Moscow Standard Time to become Moscow Summer Time (MSD), making it UTC+04:00.

In 2011, the Russian government proclaimed that daylight saving time would in future be observed all year round, thus effectively displacing standard time—an action which the government claimed emerged from health concerns attributed to the annual shift back-and-forth between standard time and daylight saving time. On 27 March 2011, Muscovites set their clocks forward for a final time, effectively observing MSD, or UTC+04:00, permanently.

On 29 March 2014, after the annexation of Crimea by the Russian Federation, the Republic of Crimea and the city of Sevastopol—two federal subjects established by Russia on the Crimean Peninsula—switched their time to MSK on 30 March 2014 (from UTC+02:00 with DST to UTC+04:00 with permanent DST) and then when permanent DST in Russia was removed on 26 October 2014 the time became UTC+03:00 without DST all year.

On 1 July 2014, the State Duma passed a bill partially repealing the 2011 change, putting Moscow Time on permanent UTC+03:00 and thus back to standard time.

Usage 
Most of the European part of Russia (west of the Ural Mountains) uses Moscow Time. In Kaliningrad Oblast, Kaliningrad time (UTC+02:00) is used. Samara Oblast and Udmurtia use Samara time (UTC+04:00) and Perm Krai, Bashkortostan and Orenburg Oblast use Yekaterinburg time (UTC+05:00). Since 2014, Moscow Time has been observed in Crimea after it was annexed and in Russian-occupied territories of Ukraine, including after their declared annexation in 2022.

Past usage 
Prior to 26 October 2014, Moscow Time was UTC+03:00. Daylight saving time was used in the summer, advancing it to UTC+04:00.

UTC+03:00 was also formerly used in European parts of what was then the USSR:
 Estonia, in 1940–1941 and 1944-1989
 Latvia, in 1940–1941 and 1944-1989
 Lithuania, in 1940–1941 and 1944-1989
 Kaliningrad Oblast (Russia), in 1946–1989
 Moldova, in 1944-1990
 Ukraine, in 1930–1941 and 1943-1990 
 Samara Oblast (Russia), in 1989–1991 and again from 2010–2011.
 Belarus, in 1930–1941, 1944-1991 and again from 2014–present.
 Crimea, in 1930–1941, 1944-1990, 1994-1997 and again from 2014–present.

Moscow Summer Time (UTC+04:00), was first applied in 1981 and was used:
 until 1989 in Estonia, Kaliningrad Oblast, Latvia and Lithuania
 until 1990 in Moldova and Ukraine
 until 1991 in Belarus
 between 1989 and 1991 and in 2010 in Samara Oblast.

In 1922–1930 and 1991–1992, Moscow observed Eastern European Time (UTC+02:00). Daylight saving time (UTC+03:00) was observed in the summer of 1991, and the city and region reverted to UTC+03:00 by the summer of 1992.

The time in Moscow has been as follows (the following list of DST usage may not be accurate):

Anomalies 
Since political, in addition to purely geographical, criteria are used in the drawing of time zones, it follows that time zones do not precisely adhere to meridian lines. The MSK (UTC+03:00) time zone, were it drawn by purely geographical terms, would consist of exactly the area between meridians 37°30' E and 52°30' E. As a result, there are European locales that despite lying in an area with a "physical" UTC+03:00 time, are in another time zone; likewise, there are European areas that have gone for UTC+03:00, even though their "physical" time zone is different from that. Following is a list of such anomalies:

Areas located outside UTC+03:00 longitudes using Moscow Time (UTC+03:00) time

Areas west of 37°30' E ("physical" UTC+02:00) that use UTC+03:00
 The entirety of Belarus with 23°10' E as the westernmost point where MSK is used
 Western Russia, including Saint Petersburg, half of Moscow and Crimea

Areas between 52°30' E and 67°30' E ("physical" UTC+04:00) that use UTC+03:00
 Russia, including most of Franz Josef Land, Yuzhny Island, most of Severny Island with an exception to the very east, and some parts of the Russian mainland (Komi Republic, Nenets Autonomous Okrug, east of Kirov Oblast and Tatarstan)

Areas east of 67°30' E ("physical" UTC+05:00) that use UTC+03:00
 The very east of Severny Island in Russia with 69°2' E as the easternmost point where MSK is used

Areas located within UTC+03:00 longitudes (37°30' E – 52°30' E) using other time zones

Areas that use UTC+02:00
 Eastern parts of Ukraine

Areas that use UTC+04:00
 Georgia with an exception of Abkhazia and South Ossetia
 Armenia
 Azerbaijan
 The Russian Oblasts of Astrakhan, Samara, Saratov and Ulyanovsk with an exception to the very east
 Western half of the Russian Republic of Udmurtia

Areas that use UTC+05:00
 The western tip of Perm Krai in Russia, and the western parts of the Orenburg Oblast in Russia

See also 
East Africa Time, also in UTC+03:00
Time in Russia

Notes

External links 
 Current time in Moscow

Time zones
Time in Russia